The House of Worth was a French fashion house that specialized in haute couture, ready-to-wear clothes, and perfumes. It was founded in 1858 by English designer Charles Frederick Worth. It continued to operate under his descendants until 1952 and closed in 1956. The House of Worth fashion brand was revived in 1999.

The Historic House of Worth 

Charles Frederick Worth opened his own design house in 1858, in partnership with Otto Bobergh, in Paris at 7 Rue de la Paix. Worth previously worked at Swan & Edgar and Lewis & Allenby in London, and at Maison Gagelin in Paris. It was at Gagelin where he first established his reputation as a dressmaker. In the 1850s, his designs for Gagelin won commendations at Universal Expositions in London and Paris.

While Worth was still at Gagelin, the house had supplied the trousseau for the newly married Empress Eugénie. After opening his own house, the Empress appointed him court designer. Her patronage increased his reputation and business success. He dressed leading performers of the day: Sarah Bernhardt, Lillie Langtry, Jenny Lind, and Nellie Melba. Worth also created unique special-event pieces for his best clients, such as masquerade ball costumes and wedding dresses.

Worth was known for preparing several designs for each season, which were then shown by live models. Clients would make their selections and have them made to their own measurements in his work rooms. His designs incorporated elegant fabrics, detailed trimming, and superb fit. Wealthy women in the 19th century had four changes of dress during the day, and many clients would purchase their entire wardrobes from Worth.

In 1871, Worth dissolved his association with Bobergh. His design and promotional talents had made the House of Worth a highly successful international business. Upon Worth's death in 1895, sons Gaston-Lucien (1853–1924) and Jean-Philippe (1856–1926) assumed the business.

In 1924, the House, now operated by grandson Jacques Worth, ventured into the perfume market. The company's first fragrance, developed by perfumer Maurice Blanchet, was Dans la Nuit, and glassmaker René Lalique was commissioned to design the bottle. Les Parfumes Worth was established as a separate business and launched more than 20 fragrances between 1924 and 1947.

The house remained successful under Worth's descendants but faced increasing competition. In 1950, the House of Worth was taken over by the House of Paquin. In 1952, the Worth family influence ended with the retirement of great-grandson Roger. In 1956, the house shut down the couture operations. From 1968, House of Worth was owned by Sidney Massin of Massin Furs in Wigmore Street, London] who put it up for sale in 1987 for £750,000.

After the closure of the Paris couture house, Les Parfums Worth was bought by Société Maurice Blanchet. It was sold in 1992, to David Reimer and became part of International Classic Brands. It was acquired by Lenthéric in 1999 and was then part of Shaneel Enterprises, Ltd.

Gallery

Fragrances of the Les Parfumes Worth. 1924 – 1947

 Dans la Nuit (1924) – M. Blanchet/R. Lalique (the bottle)
 Vers le Jour (1925) – M. Blanchet/R. Lalique (the bottle)
 Sans Adieu (1929) – M. Blanchet/R. Lalique (the bottle)
 Je Reviens (1932) – M. Blanchet
 Vers Toi (1934) – M. Blanchet
 Projets (1935)
 Imprudence (1938) – M. Blanchet
 Requête (1944)

The Revived House of Worth 

In 1999, the House of Worth fashion brand was revived by entrepreneurs Dilesh and Hitesh Mehta. The fashion and perfume intellectual properties were consolidated from the original firm's various family and corporate descendants into a single corporate entity. Giovanni Bedin became its principal designer after previously working for Karl Lagerfeld and Thierry Mugler.

The house attempted to revive the couture operation with the first new collection presented for the Spring/Summer 2010 seasons. The look updated and modernized Edwardian corsets which were elaborately decorated with lace and feathers. The voluminous crinolines of the nineteenth century were now ballerina-like skirts of tulle netting. The short (65 cm) skirts would also be featured in subsequent couture collections.
The following year, the house introduced its first prêt-à-porter collection, to be sold in the United States under the label Courtworth. The renewed couture effort, however, was unsuccessful, and the last collection premiered during the Fall/Winter 2013 season.

The revived house continues to produce perfumes. It reissued Dans la Nuit (2000) and Je Reviens (2005) in reformulated versions. It also introduced new scents Je Reviens Couture (2004), W Superbe, Joyeux Retour, and Courtisan.

References

Further reading 
Chantal Trubert-Tollu, Françoise Vittu, Fabrice Ollivieri, and Jean-Marie Martin-Hattemberg. The House of Worth: The Birth of Haute Couture, 1858-1954. London: Thames & Hudson, 2017.

Chantal Trubert-Tollu, Françoise Vittu, Fabrice Ollivieri et Jean-Marie Martin-Hattemberg. La Maison Worth: Naissance de la Haute Couture, 1858-1954. Paris: Ed.Bibliothèque des Arts, 2017.

Worth, Jean Philippe. A Century of Fashion. Trans. Ruth Scott Miller. Boston: Little, Brown, and Co., 1928.

External links 

 Online exhibition of gowns by Worth from 1860 to 1952-3 at the Museum of the City of New York.
 Worth dress, ca. 1905, in the Staten Island Historical Society Online Collections Database
 - Mid-1920s advertising booklet promoting Worth's role in 19th and early 20th century fashion.
Worth sketch collection, 1918 from The Irene Lewisohn Costume Reference Library, The Costume Institute, The Metropolitan Museum of Art, New York.
 Worth Perfumes and Colognes on Fragrantica
 Fragrances by Worth on Basenotes

Defunct companies of France
Clothing companies of France
Clothing companies established in 1858
Design companies disestablished in 1956
Perfume houses
1858 establishments in France
1956 disestablishments in France